Sidney Jayarathna  is a Sri Lankan politician and a member of the Parliament of Sri Lanka. He was elected from Polonnaruwa District in 2015. He is a member of the United National Party.

References

Living people
Members of the 15th Parliament of Sri Lanka
United National Party politicians
Sinhalese politicians
Year of birth missing (living people)